is a 2020 Japanese anime television series produced by P.A. Works and Aniplex and directed by Yoshiyuki Asai. It aired from October to December 2020. The story was originally conceived by Jun Maeda, who also wrote the screenplay, with original character design by Na-Ga. Both Maeda and Na-Ga are from the visual novel brand Key, and The Day I Became a God is the third original anime series created by Key following Angel Beats! in 2010 and Charlotte in 2015.

Plot
While preparing for the upcoming graduation exams in the final year of high school, Yōta Narukami meets a mysterious young girl named Hina Sato, who claims she is a god named Odin. She tells Yōta that the world will end in 30 days, but he remains skeptical despite her making numerous correct predictions. The story revolves around Hina assisting Yōta as he helps people around town while she adjusts to her new life. As he spends more time with her, he begins to uncover more secrets about her life and how she became a "god".

Characters

A girl who wears a veil and claims that the world will be ending in 30 days. She has a complex concerning her surname due to how common it is, and notices how Yōta and his family and friends have names related to gods. She prefers to be called "Odin". The Narukami family claims she is a distant relative and take her in despite Yōta's objections. She enjoys food despite claiming that gods do not need to eat and is very fond of video games. She assists Yōta with his attempts to confess to Kyōko by using her omniscience.

A high school student who unexpectedly meets Hina while playing basketball one day. He is skeptical of Hina's claim of the world ending in 30 days, but goes on to take care of her despite those reservations. Hina offers him her powers to support his goal of wooing his childhood friend Kyōko.

Yōta's childhood friend. Due to her mother passing away while she was young, she has a very calm and passive personality. Despite her calmness, she grew up to be very smart and beautiful, which led her to becoming extremely popular with other boys. Due to her calmness, she often rejects Yōta's advances with little thought. She is also very good with the piano and seems to believe that Hina is telling the truth. She enjoys watching baseball.

Yōta's best friend.

 
Yōta's younger sister. She is part of the film club and looks up to her senpai Hikari Jingūji. She initially has a dislike of Hina as she thinks she is very weird. She is a very caring and stubborn person. She aims to make a movie of her own.

A mysterious young boy with silver hair. He is younger than Yōta, but is a hacking prodigy. He utilizes a special set of gloves and hairclip to connect to interface with a variety of devices and networks. He is currently assisting the CEO and his assistant with her plans.

Sora's senpai and alumni of the film club at her school. She works at the failing ramen shop known as Ramen Heavenward in order to pay off a large debt.

A very famous lawyer that Yōta admires greatly. She has an extreme fascination with the game mahjong and hosts tournaments for it. She meets Yōta after Hina assists him in winning a mahjong tournament.

A mysterious older woman who works with Hiroto to discover the truth behind a scientist's actions before he died. Despite her seemingly cold attitude, she shows motherly affection to Hiroto.

Hiroto's supervisor who works for the CEO.

Yōta and Sora's mother. She is very caring and openly welcomes Hina to the household when Yōta calls her.

Yōta and Sora's father.

Media

Anime
The Day I Became a God is the third original anime series from visual novel developer Key's Jun Maeda and Na-Ga, in collaboration with Aniplex and P.A. Works, after Angel Beats! (2010) and Charlotte (2015). On April 19, 2019, P.A. Works producer Mitsuhito Tsuji expressed desire to work on a new original anime with Key and Maeda. On November 26, 2019, Key teased on Twitter that it had eight projects in the works for its 21st anniversary, which included the Planetarian: Snow Globe original video animation project, the Kud Wafter anime film, Maeda's Heaven Burns Red video game, an unnamed visual novel, and four secret projects. On April 1, 2020, the Twitter account for Angel Beats! and Charlotte teased that a project in 2020 would be revealed.

On May 10, 2020, Key, P.A. Works, and Aniplex held a livestream on Niconico, and formally announced The Day I Became a God anime project. The livestream revealed that Maeda would be credited for the original work and script, and Na-Ga with original character design, and the anime was scheduled for an October 2020 premiere. P.A. Works also tweeted that the project had been in development for "a while", and the voice acting was pre-recorded. On May 25, 2020, a special "prologue program" aired on Tokyo MX, revealing that Ayane Sakura would be voicing Hina, as well as revealing Charlotte director Yoshiyuki Asai would be returning as director. On July 25, 2020, a second livestream was held, revealing the first full promotional video, and also revealed additional staff and cast members, with Manabu Nii serving as character designer, and Manyo and Maeda composing the series' music. The stream also teased a second promotional video being released in September 2020.

The series aired from October 11 to December 27, 2020 on Tokyo MX, BS11, GTV, GYT, ABC, and Mētele, and other channels. It also aired on BBT, BSS, NCC, tvk, and AT-X. The series ran for 12 episodes, and it was released on six Blu-ray and DVD volumes from December 23, 2020 to May 26, 2021 in Japan. Nagi Yanagi, in collaboration with Maeda, performed the opening theme song , as well as the ending theme song "Goodbye Seven Seas".

Funimation licensed the series; they streamed it in North America, the British Isles and Latin America on their website, on AnimeLab in Australia and New Zealand, and on Wakanim in Europe. On October 30, 2020, Funimation announced that the series would receive an English dub, which premiered the following day. Following Sony's acquisition of Crunchyroll, the series was moved to Crunchyroll. The series is licensed by Muse Communication in Southeast Asia and South Asia, and it was streamed on iQIYI and aired on Animax in Southeast Asia.

Episode list

Manga
A manga adaptation, illustrated by Zen, was serialized on Kadokawa Corporation's ComicWalker and Niconico Seiga websites from November 14, 2020 to January 25, 2022 via Dengeki G's Magazine. Two volumes were published from May 27, 2021 to February 26, 2022.

Volume list

Notes

References

External links
 

2020 anime television series debuts
Anime with original screenplays
Aniplex franchises
Crunchyroll anime
Fiction about diseases and disorders
Key (company)
Muse Communication
P.A.Works
School life in anime and manga
Seinen manga
Tokyo MX original programming